Muzaffer Pasha, born as Ladislas Czaykowski/Władysław Czajkowski (1837/40 - 1907, Beirut, Lebanon, Ottoman Empire), son of a Polish count and Polish émigré in the Ottoman Empire, Michał Czajkowski (Sadık Pasha), was in 1902–1907 Governor General (Mutessarıf) of Mount Lebanon, a post reserved by international treaty for a Catholic of Ottoman nationality after the civil unrest and international intervention of 1860.

Czajkowski was educated in Belgium and France, graduating from the School of St Cyr in 1861. After arrival in Istanbul, he was aide-de-camp to the Grand vizier Mehmed Fuad Pasha from 1863 to 1866; then to the Sultan Abdülaziz from 1867 to 1870, during which he accompanied the monarch on his European tour. In 1870 he was appointed to the command of a section of cavalry in the military school, and held that office until the outbreak of the Russo-Turkish War (1877–1878), when he went to the front. He served on the staff, then as colonel of a regiment of cossacks. After the end of the war, the Sultan entrusted him with making a plan for reorganization of the Turkish army, which he finished in 1885, when he was raised to the rank of general in the Ottoman Army. Before his election as mutessarif in September 1902, Czajkowski had been manager of the Sultan´s horse-breeding stud since 1888.

After accepting the election, he was promoted to Field Marshal (Müsir) in the Ottoman army, and received the rank of Vizier.

References

Governors of the Ottoman Empire
Polish emigrants to the Ottoman Empire
19th-century births
1907 deaths